Burtner is an unincorporated community in Washington County, Maryland, United States. Search Well was listed on the National Register of Historic Places in 1983.

References

Unincorporated communities in Washington County, Maryland
Unincorporated communities in Maryland